"Zun Da Da" is a song by Puerto Rican singer Zion. It was selected as the second single from his debut solo studio album The Perfect Melody (2007). The song was released to radio stations on July 20, 2007 and released as a digital download on April 9, 2008. In 2022, Rolling Stone listed the song at number 99 on its list of the 100 Greatest Reggaeton Songs of All Time.

Charts

References

2007 singles
2008 singles
Zion (artist) songs
Reggaeton songs
2007 songs
Motown singles
Songs written by Wise (composer)